Nikolay Evtimov Mladenov (born 5 May 1972) is a Bulgarian politician and diplomat who served as  Bulgaria's Minister of Defense from 27 July 2009 to 27 January 2010 and as the minister of foreign affairs in the government of then prime minister Boyko Borisov from 2010 to 2013. Prior to that, he was a Member of the European Parliament from 2007 to 2009.

On 2 August 2013 Mladenov was appointed as United Nations Secretary-General Ban Ki-moon's Special Representative for Iraq and Head of the United Nations Assistance Mission for Iraq. From 5 February 2015 until 31 December 2020, Mladenov served as UN Special Coordinator for the Middle East Peace Process. When he left that role, he received praise from both Israeli and Palestinian leaders.

Mladenov was named in the Pandora Papers but denied wrongdoing.

Early life and education
Mladenov was born on 5 May 1972 in Sofia. In 1995, he graduated from the University of National and World Economy, majoring in international relations. The following year he obtained an MA in war studies from King's College London. His father, Evtim Mladenov, worked for the Committee for State Security and his uncle Mladen was an ambassador on behalf of the communist Bulgarian regime.

Career
Between 1996 and 1998 Mladenov was program director of the Open Society Foundations in Sofia, followed by an appointment as a program coordinator in the social department of the World Bank for Bulgaria. In 1999 he founded the European Institute in Sofia and was its director until 2001. He was a member of parliament for the United Democratic Forces in the 39th National Assembly, parliamentary secretary (until March 2002), and vice chairman of the committee on European integration and the committee on foreign affairs, defense and security.

On 12 March 2002 Mladenov was elected to the national executive council of the party Union of Democratic Forces. Later he was appointed spokesman of the party. From 22 February 2004 he was the vice-president of UDF, resigning on 16 August 2005.

From 2005 to 2007 Mladenov served as a consultant to the World Bank, International Republican Institute and National Democratic Institute in Bulgaria, Afghanistan, Yemen and other Middle Eastern countries. In 2006 he worked as an adviser to parliamentary committees on defense and foreign policy and cooperation of the Iraqi Parliament.

Member of the European Parliament, 2007–2009
Mladenov was number 3 on the candidate list of the GERB party for the European elections 2007. As a member of the European Parliament Mladenov was a member of the committees on internal market and consumer protection, foreign affairs, and the subcommittee on security and defence. He was also the first vice chairman of the parliament's delegation for relations with Iraq and member of the delegations to Israel and Afghanistan.

Mladenov is a signatory of the Prague Declaration on European Conscience and Communism.

Career with the United Nations, 2013–2020
On 2 August 2013, Mladenov was appointed as United Nations Special Representative for Iraq and Head of the United Nations Assistance Mission for Iraq (UNAMI) by the United Nations Secretary-General Ban Ki-moon. He succeeded Martin Kobler of Germany. At the time, the country security had deteriorated as Sunni Islamist groups stepped up an insurgency against the Shi’ite-led government.

On 5 February 2015, Mladenov was appointed United Nations Special Coordinator for the Middle East Peace Process, replacing Dutch diplomat Robert Serry. As envoy, he caught flak over his bluntness. In 2016, he led efforts of the Quartet on the Middle East on issuing a report on concrete steps that could at least preserve the possibility of a two-state solution.

In late 2018, Mladenov was mentioned in news media as potential successor of Staffan de Mistura as United Nations Special Envoy for Syria.

Mladenov welcomed the Israel–United Arab Emirates peace agreement, adding that it would stop Israel's annexation plans which the UN has repeatedly called for to be stopped and hoped it will restart dialogue between Israel and Palestinians.

In December 2020 the Security Council approved United Nations Secretary-General António Guterres’s proposal to appoint Mladenov as the new UN envoy for Libya. However, on December 21st, he withdrew from the position citing "personal and family reasons.

Other activities
 European Council on Foreign Relations (ECFR), Member

See also

List of foreign ministers in 2013 
 Foreign relations of Bulgaria
List of Bulgarians

References

External links
 Personal Blog 
 CNN Interview 

1972 births
Living people
University of National and World Economy alumni
Alumni of King's College London
Foreign ministers of Bulgaria
Special Representatives of the Secretary-General of the United Nations
Politicians from Sofia
Union of Democratic Forces (Bulgaria) politicians
GERB MEPs
MEPs for Bulgaria 2007–2009
Bulgarian officials of the United Nations
Karl Marx Higher Institute of Economics alumni
Defence ministers of Bulgaria